Tradewind Airport  is a privately owned public use airport in Randall County, Texas, United States. It is located three nautical miles (3.5 mi, 5.6 km) southeast of the central business district of Amarillo, Texas. Established in 1946 by Shelby Kritser, Tradewind airport has been a hub for general aviation in Amarillo. Shelby Kritser died in 1966 in an aircraft accident. After his death the airport was sold to Jimmy Whittenburg who owned and operated the airport until 2001, who then sold the airport to Perry Williams who owns and operates the airport today. The FBo building was built in 2014, many maintenance facilities and private air carriers. The Shelby's Restaurant on the field was opened in 2022 in tribute to Shelby Kritser.

Facilities and aircraft 
It has two asphalt paved runways: 17/35 is 5,098 by 60 feet (1,554 x 18 m) and 5/23 is 3,000 by 60 feet (914 x 18 m). It also has one helipad with a 50 by 50 feet (15 x 15 m) asphalt surface.

For the 12-month period ending June 22, 2009, the airport had 32,790 aircraft operations, an average of 89 per day: 99.9% general aviation and 0.1% military. At that time there were 95 aircraft based at this airport: 84% single-engine, 13% multi-engine, 2% jet and 1% helicopter.

See also
Rick Husband Amarillo International Airport

References

External links 
  at Texas DOT Airport Directory
 Aerial image as of April 2002 from USGS The National Map
 
 

Airports in Texas
Buildings and structures in Randall County, Texas
Transportation in Randall County, Texas